Epichloë guerinii is a hybrid asexual species in the fungal genus Epichloë. 

A systemic and seed-transmissible grass symbiont first described in 2007,  Epichloë guerinii is a natural allopolyploid of Epichloë gansuensis and a strain in the Epichloë typhina complex.

Epichloë guerinii is found in Europe, where it has been identified in the grass species Melica ciliata and Melica transsilvanica.

References

guerinii
Fungi described in 2007
Fungi of Europe